Michelangelo Alessandro Colli-Marchi, or Michele Angelo Alessandro Colli-Marchei or Michael Colli, (Vigevano 1738 – Florence 22 December 1808) joined the Austrian army, became a general officer, and led the army of the Kingdom of Sardinia-Piedmont for three years, including its unsuccessful campaign against Napoleon Bonaparte in 1796. In early 1797, he was given command of the army of the Papal States, but was defeated at Faenza.

Early career

Born in Lombardy in 1738, Colli enlisted in the army of the Habsburg monarchy as an infantry officer in 1756 at the age of 18. During the Seven Years' War, he fought at the Battle of Prague in 1757 and the Battle of Torgau in 1760, and was wounded in the latter action. He received the noble title Freiherr in 1764. By the War of the Bavarian Succession he led a battalion in the Caprara Infantry Regiment 48 with the rank of major. In 1779 he was appointed oberst (colonel). During the Austro-Turkish War he fought at Osijek and Belgrade, where he was wounded again. He received promotion to general-major in December 1788. He commanded Josefstadt fortress in 1789.

Colli was thin, of normal height and with big blue eyes. His contemporaries described him as intelligent, courageous, and cool under fire. He sometimes needed to be carried around on a stretcher because of his war wounds.

Italian service

In 1793, the Austrian government transferred Colli to the Sardinian-Piedmontese army and promoted him to Feldmarschal-Leutnant (lieutenant general) that December. In this capacity, he led the Sardinian army from 1793 to 1796. He led Piedmontese soldiers in action at Saorge on 12 June 1793 and again on 24 April 1794. In November 1795 he fought at the Battle of Loano. Relations between the Sardinian kingdom and their Austrian allies were strained. As an Austrian soldier leading a foreign army, Colli felt that he was in an awkward situation, working for two masters.

In the spring of 1796, Emperor Francis II of Austria appointed Colli's friend, Feldzeugmeister Johann Beaulieu, to lead the Austrian army in Piedmont. But because the Austrian government gave Beaulieu secret instructions warning him not to trust the Piedmontese, the two generals were unable to work out a coherent allied strategy. When Beaulieu launched an attack on the extreme right flank of the French army, Bonaparte immediately thrust between the Austrian and Sardinian armies. In the Montenotte Campaign, the French general mauled the Austrian army and drove it northeast, then turned west and relentlessly pressed the Piedmontese back. Colli's rear guards ably defended themselves at the Battle of Ceva and at San Michele Mondovi, but the Piedmontese were soundly beaten at the Battle of Mondovì on 21 April.

By signing the Armistice of Cherasco on 28 April, King Victor Amadeus III of Sardinia took his country out of the First Coalition. This event released Colli from his obligations to Piedmont and he joined Beaulieu's army as a division commander. Since he led the soldiers of the northern flank on a retreat through Milan and Cassano d'Adda, he missed the Battle of Lodi in May. He commanded Beaulieu's left wing at the Battle of Borghetto at the end of May. Colli's duties with the Austrian army in Italy ended when Feldmarschall Dagobert von Wurmser replaced Beaulieu in early July.

The following year found Colli leading the army of the Papal States.  Just days after Pope Pius VI fled Rome, however, a French force led by Claude Victor crushed Colli's new command at the Battle of Castel Bolognese on 3 February 1797, from which the Papal army never recovered and future resistance was futile. This forced Pope Pius VI to sue for peace. Colli also served in the Neapolitan army. From 1804 to 1807 he served as an Austrian envoy in Italy and died at Florence on 22 December 1808.

References
 Boycott-Brown, Martin. The Road to Rivoli. London: Cassell & Co., 2001. 
 Chandler, David. The Campaigns of Napoleon. New York: Macmillan, 1966.
 Chandler, David. Dictionary of the Napoleonic Wars. New York: Macmillan, 1979. 
 
 Smith, Digby. The Napoleonic Wars Data Book. London: Greenhill, 1998.

Footnotes

External links
 Colli by Digby Smith, compiled by Leopold Kudrna

Generals of former Italian states
Austrian Empire military leaders of the French Revolutionary Wars
Military leaders of the French Revolutionary Wars
Italian people of the French Revolutionary Wars
Italian military personnel in Austrian armies
18th-century Italian military personnel
1738 births
1808 deaths
People from Vigevano
Austrian generals